Ekaterina Zvereva (born 2 March 1983) is a Russian female badminton player. In 2013, she became the runner-up of Israel International tournament with his partner Jan Frohlich in mixed doubles event.

References

External links
 

1983 births
Living people
Russian female badminton players
21st-century Russian women